À partir de maintenant is an album of the French singer Johnny Hallyday.

Track listing

Source: À partir de maintenant track listing

References

1980 albums
Johnny Hallyday albums
Philips Records albums